Marston is an unincorporated community in Duncan Township, Mercer County, Illinois, United States.

References

Unincorporated communities in Mercer County, Illinois
Unincorporated communities in Illinois